Bone Hard Zaggin is the debut studio album by American rapper Big Mello from Houston, Texas. It was released on September 4, 1992 via Rap-A-Lot Records.

Track listing

Personnel
Curtis Donnell Davis – main artist, vocals, co-producer
Mark "Icy Hott" McCardell – guest vocals (tracks: 15, 18)
Christopher "3-2" Barriere – guest vocals (tracks: 15, 18)
Michael "Big Mike" Barnett – guest vocals (tracks: 15, 18)
Simon "Crazy C" Cullins – guest vocals (track 18), keyboards, mixing, producer, presenter
Harvey Jerome Kelley – guest vocals (track 18), scratches, producer, presenter
James A. Smith – guest vocals (track 1), executive producer
Leslie "Lez Moné" Hall – guest vocals (track 17)
Cliff Blodget – executive producer
Peter Reardon – engineering, production coordinator, art direction
Richard Simpson – engineering
Tony "Big Chief" Randle – production coordinator
Mike Burnett – art direction, photography
Kevin Bakos – artwork
Rick Saenz – artwork

Charts

References

External links

1992 debut albums
Big Mello albums
Rap-A-Lot Records albums